

League table

Results

Top scorers

Cup

Qualification
Partizan Beograd 4 – 1 Oktobar

Kvarner Rijeka 0 – 1 Partizan

(rest unknown)

Round of Sixteen
Partizan Beograd 5 – 1 Proleter Osijek

X x – x X

X x – x X

X x – x X

X x – x X

BSK Beograd – x X

Dinamo Zagreb x – x X

Crvena Zvezda Beograd x – x X

Quarter finals
Crvena Zvezda Beograd x – x X

Partizan Beograd 3 – 0 BSK Beograd

X x – x X

Dinamo Zagreb x – x X

Semi finals
Crvena Zvezda Beograd 1 – 0 Partizan

Dinamo Zagreb 2 – 1 Hajduk Split

Finals
24 December 1950 – Belgrade, Serbia

Red Star Belgrade 1 – 1 NK Dinamo Zagreb

Stadium: JNA Stadium

Attendance: 50,000

Referee: M. Matančić (Belgrade)

Dinamo: Branko Stinčić, Svemir Delić, Tomislav Crnković, Krešo Pukšec, Ivan Horvat, Dragutin Cizarić, Branko Režek, Božidar Senčar, Franjo Wölfl, Željko Čajkovski, Zvonko Strnad

Crvena Zvezda: Srđan Mrkušić, Dimitrije Tadić, Ivan Zvekanović, Bela Palfi, Milivoje Đurđević, Predrag Đajić, Tihomir Ognjanov, Rajko Mitić, Kosta Tomašević, Siniša Zlatković, Branislav Vukosavljević

Finals Replay
31 December 1950 – Belgrade, Serbia

Dinamo Zagreb 0 – 3 Crvena Zvezda

Stadium: JNA Stadium

Attendance: 45,000

Referee: Leo Lemešić (Split)

Dinamo: Branko Stinčić, Svemir Delić, Tomislav Crnković, Krešimir Pukšec, Ivan Horvat, Dragutin Cizarić, Stjepan Kašner, Branko Režek, Dionizije Dvornić, Božidar Senčar, Zvonko Strnad

Crvena Zvezda: Srđan Mrkušić, Diskic, Ivan Zvekanović, Bela Palfi, Milivoje Đurđević, Predrag Đajić, Tihomir Ognjanov, Rajko Mitić, Kosta Tomašević, Siniša Zlatković, Branislav Vukosavljević

See also
1950 Yugoslav Second League
Yugoslav Cup
Yugoslav League Championship
Football Association of Yugoslavia

External links
Yugoslavia Domestic Football Full Tables

Yugoslav First League seasons
Yugo
1
Yugo
1